Hyperplatys pardalis is a species of longhorn beetles of the subfamily Lamiinae. It was described by Henry Walter Bates in 1881, and is known from western Mexico to Guatemala, and Honduras.

References

Beetles described in 1881
Beetles of North America
Acanthocinini